Working Girl (Original Soundtrack Album) is the soundtrack album to the 1988 Mike Nichols film Working Girl, released by Arista Records, on August 29, 1989.

The film's main theme, "Let the River Run", was composed, written, and performed by American singer-songwriter Carly Simon. The film's additional soundtrack was scored by Simon and Rob Mounsey.

The album peaked at No. 45 on the Billboard 200. As a single, "Let the River Run" reached peak positions of No. 49 on the Billboard Hot 100, and No. 11 on the Billboard Adult Contemporary chart in early 1989.

Awards
Simon became the first artist in history to win a Grammy Award, a Golden Globe Award, and an Academy Award for a song composed and written, as well as performed, entirely by a single artist.

Track listing
Credits adapted from the album's liner notes.

Personnel

 Arnie Acosta – mastering (6)
 Gary Barnacle – saxophone (6)
John Barnes – acoustic piano (10)
 Tony Beard – drums (6)
 Dick Beetham – assistant engineer (6)
 Art Blakey – drums (9)
 Michael Boddicker – synthesizer programming (10)
 Dave Brubaker – design  
 Paul Chambers – bass (9)
 Steve Chase – assistant engineer (6)
 Vivian Cherry – backing vocals (1)
 Kacey Cisyk – backing vocals (1)
 Mickey Curry – drums (1)
 Paulinho da Costa – percussion (10)
 Chris de Burgh – lead vocals (6), guitar (6)
 George Doering – guitar  (10)
 Sue Evans – percussion (8)
 Frank Filipetti – mixing (1)
 Chuck Findley – trumpet (10)
 Frank Floyd – backing vocals (1)
 John Giblin – bass (6)
 Nick Glennie-Smith – keyboards (6)
 Gary Grant – trumpet (10)
 Gordon Grody – backing vocals (1)
 Lani Groves – backing vocals (1)
 Gerre Hancock – vocal conductor (5)
 Paul Hardiman – engineer (6), producer (6)
 Gary Herbig – reeds (10)
 Jim Horn – reeds (10)
 Dick Hyde – trombone (10)
 Chip Jackson – bass (3)
 J.J. Johnson – trombone (9)
 Robbie Kilgore – guitar (8)
 Ian Kojima – saxophone (6)
 Jamie Lawrence – synthesizer (7)
 Trevor Lawrence – associate producer (10), horn arrangements (10), rhythm arrangements (10)
 Bradshaw Leigh – engineer (2, 3, 4, 7, 8), mixing (2-5, 7, 8)
 Tim Leitner – engineer (1)
 Alfred Lion – producer (9)
 Chris Lord-Alge – engineer (5)
 Stephen Marcussen – mastering (10)
 Al Marnie – bass (6)
 Danny McBride – guitar (6)
 Ron McMaster – digital transfers (9)
 Thelonious Monk – acoustic piano (9)
 Glenn Morrow – keyboards (6)
 Rob Mounsey – producer (1, 3, 4, 5, 8), keyboards (1), acoustic piano (3), string arrangements and conductor (4), vocal arrangements (5), synthesizer (8)
 Yuji Muraoka – liner notes  
 Pino Palladino – bass (6)
 Phil Palmer – guitar (6)
 Richard Perry – producer (10), rhythm arrangements (10)
 Greg Phillinganes – synthesizer (10)
 Jeff Phillips – drums (6)
 Anita Pointer – lead and backing vocals (10)
 June Pointer – backing vocals (10)
 Ruth Pointer – backing vocals (10)
 Andy Richards – keyboards (6)
 Lee Ritenour – guitar (10)
 John "J.R." Robinson – drums (10)
 Sonny Rollins – tenor saxophone (9)
 Jimmy Ryan – guitar (1, 8)
 Bill Schnee – remix (10)
 Don Sebesky – orchestral arrangements and conductor (2, 7), synthesizer (7)
 Horace Silver – acoustic piano (9)
 Frank Simms – backing vocals (1)
 Carly Simon – lead vocals (1, 7, 8), producer (1, 2, 4, 5, 7, 8)
 Harold Sinclair – photography 
 Pamela Sklar - flute 
 William D. "Smitty" Smith – organ (10)
 St. Thomas Choir of Men and Boys – vocals (5, 8)
 Grady Tate – drums (3)
 Vaneese Thomas – backing vocals (1)
 Rudy Van Gelder – engineer (9)
 Peter Van Hooke – drums (6)
 Gabe Veltri – engineer (10)  
 Nathan Watts – bass (10)
 Kurt Yaghjian – backing vocals (1)
 George Young – tenor saxophone (3)

Additional Credits
 Tracks 1, 2, 4, 5, 7 & 8 recorded and mixed at The Hit Factory and Flying Monkey Studio (New York, NY).
 Track 6 recorded at The Manor (Oxford, UK) and Marcus Recording Studios (London, England).
 Track 10 recorded at Studio 55 (Los Angeles, CA).

Charts
Album - Billboard (United States)

Singles - Billboard (United States)

Singles - International

References

External links
Carly Simon's Official Website

Comedy-drama film soundtracks
Albums produced by Rob Mounsey
1989 soundtrack albums
Carly Simon soundtracks
Arista Records soundtracks